Mollington is a village and civil parish in Cheshire, England, two miles north of the city of Chester, with the A41 Liverpool-Chester trunk road and Shropshire Union Canal to the east and southeast, the A540 Wirral Peninsula trunk road to the south and west and the A5117 link road to the north. 

At the 2011 census, the village had a population of 626.
Nearby settlements include Backford, Capenhurst, Ledsham and Wervin.

History
The name derives from Old English, meaning 'a farmstead or settlement (tūn) connected with a person named Moll'.

Mollington was mentioned in the Domesday Book as Molintune  and comprised eleven households (three villagers, three smallholders and five slaves/servants).

The village previously consisted of two separate settlements. Great Mollington was formerly known as Mollington Tarrant and was a township in the parish of Backford. It had a population of 111 in 1801, and 122 in 1851.
Little Mollington (Mollington Banastre) was a township in the parish of St. Mary on the Hill, Wirral Hundred. Its population was previously 23 in 1801, 16 in 1851 and 44 in 1901.
Both settlements were combined into Mollington civil parish in 1901 with a total population of 232, increasing to 335 in 1951 and 663 in 2001.

Mollington railway station, linking the village directly with Chester and with Liverpool via the Wirral, was closed on 7 March 1960; the station building is now a private residence.

In 1982, Mollington became the first place in Britain to have a Neighbourhood Watch scheme, following the success of similar programmes in North America.

Description
Mollington is a small semi-rural commuter village of approximately 300 homes, served by St. Oswald's Primary School (formerly Mollington Church of England Primary School) and a village hall. All other facilities are now located in other nearby suburbs of Chester following the closure of the village shop and post office. Mollington's parish church is located in the neighbouring village of Backford.

The village is served by two local bus routes, but with an infrequent service most residents move about by private transport.

Mollington is characterised by tree-lined lanes with grass verges and farm land as well as sizeable family homes. It has an open, rolling and green aspect, which made it a pleasant location for the former Mollington Hall, a country house residence, now demolished. The old red-brick boundary wall of this substantial estate still remains and is now a feature of the village obvious to those who pass through. Neighbouring large houses on the edge of the village are now luxury hotels, including the Mollington Banastre and Crabwall Manor (formerly Crabwall Hall).

Sport
Mollington is home to Mollington Cricket Club (MCC), a village team that plays friendly matches in the north west and Wales. Beginning with a one-off match on the school field in the 1980s, the team settled at the Dale Army Camp in Upton, Chester, before relocating to Whitby in Ellesmere Port. 
With an annual fixture list of 15 matches, the team has a squad of 20 players picked from the talent pool of Mollington, Backford and Saughall. The MCC has played in the Village Cricket Competition and the Cheshire Plate in the past.

See also

Listed buildings in Mollington, Cheshire

References

External links

Areas of Chester
Villages in Cheshire
Civil parishes in Cheshire